Tandonia lagostana is a species of air-breathing, keeled, land slug, a shell-less terrestrial gastropod mollusks in the family Milacidae. It is endemic to the island of Lastovo in Croatia.

References

Milacidae
Gastropods described in 1940